The women's club throw athletics event for the 2016 Summer Paralympics took place at the Estádio Olímpico João Havelange on September 9 and 11. One event was contested for 2 different classifications.

Results

F31/32
The F31/32 club throw was held on 9 September.

F51
The F51 club throw was held on the 11 September.

References

Athletics at the 2016 Summer Paralympics
2016 in women's athletics
2016